Elacatinus oceanops, commonly known as the neon goby, is a species of goby native to waters of the Atlantic and Gulf coast of North America from Florida to Belize. This species can also be found in the aquarium trade.

References

External links
 
 
 

oceanops
Fish of the Caribbean
Fish of the Gulf of Mexico
Fish described in 1904
Taxa named by David Starr Jordan